This is a list of Jewish communities in the North America, including yeshivas, Hebrew schools, Jewish day schools and synagogues.
A yeshiva (Hebrew: ישיבה) is a center for the study of Torah and the Talmud in Orthodox Judaism. A yeshiva usually is led by a rabbi with the title "Rosh Yeshiva" (Head of the Yeshiva).

Canada

Alberta
Beth Israel Synagogue
Beth Shalom Synagogue (Edmonton)
Little Synagogue on the Prairie
Temple Beth Ora Synagogue (Edmonton)

British Columbia
Congregation Beth Israel
Congregation Emanu-El (Victoria, British Columbia)
Congregation Schara Tzedeck
King David High School of Vancouver, BC
Pacific Torah Institute
Peretz Centre for Secular Jewish Culture
Vancouver Hebrew Academy
Vancouver Talmud Torah

Manitoba
Ohr HaTorah Day School
Shaarey Zedek Synagogue
Winnipeg Jewish Theatre

New Brunswick

Newfoundland and Labrador
Beth El Synagogue

Northwest Territories

Nova Scotia
Beth Israel Synagogue

Nunavut

Ontario
Adath Israel Congregation (Toronto)
Adath Shalom (Ottawa)
Anshei Minsk
Associated Hebrew Schools of Toronto
Bathurst Jewish Community Centre
Beach Hebrew Institute
Beth Israel Synagogue (Peterborough)
Beit Tikvah of Ottawa
Beth Tikvah Synagogue Toronto
Beth Avraham Yoseph of Toronto
Beth Israel Congregation (Kingston, Ontario)
Beth Tzedec Congregation
Bialik Hebrew Day School
Bnei Akiva Schools of Toronto
Canadian Jewish Political Affairs Committee
City Shul
Congregation B'nai Israel (St. Catharines)
Congregation Habonim Toronto
Congregation Knesseth Israel (Toronto)
Congregation Shaarey Zedek (Windsor, Ontario)
Eitz Chaim Schools
First Narayever Congregation
Harold Green Jewish Theatre
Holy Blossom Temple
Institute for Advanced Judaic Studies
Kiever Synagogue
Kollel Ohr Yosef
Machzikei Hadas
Morris Winchevsky School
Netivot HaTorah Day School
Or Haneshamah
Oraynu Congregation for Humanistic Judaism
Shaarei Shomayim (Toronto)
Shaarei Tzedec
Statshover Congregation of Toronto
Talpiot College (Toronto)
Temple Israel (Ottawa)
The Ward, Toronto
Tiferes Bais Yaakov
Tiferet Israel Congregation
United Synagogue Day School
Yeshiva Ner Yisroel of Toronto
Young Israel of Ottawa

Prince Edward Island

Quebec
Bagg Street Shul
Beth Ora
Bronfman Jewish Education Centre
Congregation Beth Israel Ohev Sholem
Congregation Dorshei Emet
Congregation Maghen Abraham (Montreal)
Congregation Shaar Hashomayim
Dora Wasserman Yiddish Theatre
Federation CJA
Jewish General Hospital
Jewish People's and Peretz Schools
Kiryas Tosh
Montefiore Club
Montreal Holocaust Memorial Centre
Rabbinical College of Canada
Rouyn-Noranda Synagogue
Segal Centre for Performing Arts
Shaare Zedek Congregation (Montreal)
Spanish and Portuguese Synagogue of Montreal
Temple Emanu-El-Beth Sholom
United Talmud Torahs of Montreal

Saskatchewan
Beth Israel Synagogue

Yukon

Mexico
Colegio Hebreo Maguen David
Colegio Hebreo Monte Sinaí
Colegio Hebreo Sefaradí
Colegio Hebreo Tarbut
Colegio Israelita de México
Historic Synagogue Justo Sierra 71

United States

Alabama
Agudath Israel Etz Ahayem, Montgomery, Alabama
Congregation Sha'arai Shomayim (Mobile, Alabama)
Congregation Knesseth Israel, Mountain Brook (suburb of Birmingham)
Temple Beth Or, Montgomery, Alabama
Temple Beth-El, Birmingham, Alabama
Temple Beth-El (Anniston, Alabama)
Temple Emanu-El, Birmingham, Alabama
Temple B'nai Sholom (Huntsville, Alabama)
Temple B'nai Jeshurun (Demopolis, Alabama)
Congregation Beth Shalom (Auburn, Alabama)

Alaska

Arizona
Congregation Beth Israel (Scottsdale, Arizona)
Jewish Federation of Greater Phoenix
Jewish History Museum (Tucson)
Phoenix, AZ, Hebrew Academy
Tucson, AZ, Hebrew Academy
Tucson, AZ, Temple Emanu-El
Temple Beth Israel (Phoenix, Arizona)

Arkansas

California
American Jewish University
Beth Chayim Chadashim
Beth Jacob Congregation (Beverly Hills, California)
Breed Street Shul
Beyt Tikkun Synagogue
Bush Street Temple
Congregation Beth Israel (San Diego, California)
Congregation B'nai Israel (Sacramento, California)
Congregation Ner Tamid
Congregation Beth Israel-Judea
Congregation Emanu-El (San Francisco, California)
Congregation Sherith Israel (San Francisco, California)
Congregation Beth Israel (Berkeley, California)
Congregation Beth Am (Los Altos Hills, California)
Congregation B'nai Israel (Daly City, California)
Congregation Emanu-El (San Francisco, California)
Summer Camp Ramah, Ojai
Pacific Jewish Center, Los Angeles
Pasadena Jewish Temple and Center
Rodef Sholom (San Rafael, California)
Sephardic Temple Tifereth Israel
Sinai Temple (Los Angeles, California)
Stephen S. Wise Temple
Temple Beth Israel (Fresno, California)
Temple Israel (Stockton, California)
Temple Sinai (Oakland, California)
Temple Beth Israel of Highland Park and Eagle Rock
Temple Israel of Hollywood
Valley Beth Shalom
Wilshire Boulevard Temple
Yeshiva Ohr Elchonon Chabad/West Coast Talmudical Seminary, Los Angeles
Ziegler School of Rabbinic Studies

Colorado
Beth HaMedrosh Hagodol-Beth Joseph, Denver, CO.
Denver West Side Jewish Community
Temple Aaron, Trinidad, Colorado
Temple Emanuel (Curtis Street, Denver, Colorado)
Temple Sinai (Denver, Colorado)
Denver, CO, Yeshiva Toras Chaim

Connecticut
 Achavath Achim Synagogue
 Agudath Sholem Synagogue
 Ahavas Sholem Synagogue
 Anshei Israel Synagogue
 Beth Israel Synagogue (New Haven, Connecticut)
 Beth Israel Synagogue (Norwalk, Connecticut)
 Beth Shalom Rodfe Zedek
 Congregation B'nai Israel (Bridgeport, Connecticut)
 Congregation Beth Israel (West Hartford, Connecticut)
 Congregation B'nai Jacob (Woodbridge, Connecticut)
 Congregation Knesseth Israel (Ellington, Connecticut)
 Congregation Mishkan Israel
 Ohev Sholem Synagogue
 Temple Beth Israel (Hartford, Connecticut)
 Tephereth Israel Synagogue

Delaware

District of Columbia
Adas Israel Congregation (Washington, D.C.)
Kesher Israel, Washington, D.C.
Ohev Sholom - The National Synagogue, Washington, D.C.
Sixth & I Historic Synagogue, Washington, D.C.
Tikkun Leil Shabbat, Washington, D.C.
Washington, D.C. Jewish Community Center
Washington Hebrew Congregation

Florida
Ben Gamla Charter School
Beth Jacob Social Hall and Congregation
Congregation Ahavath Chesed, Jacksonville, FL
Congregation Beth Shira, Miami, FL
Cuban Hebrew Congregation
David Posnack Jewish Day School
Jewish Museum of Florida
Michael-Ann Russel Jewish Community Center
Rabbi Alexander S. Gross Hebrew Academy
Samuel Scheck Hillel Community Day School
Temple Beth-El (Pensacola, Florida)
Temple Beth Sholom (Miami Beach, Florida)
United Hebrews of Ocala
Weinbaum Yeshiva High School

Georgia
Congregation Beth Jacob (Atlanta)
Congregation B'nai Torah, Sandy Springs
Congregation Mickve Israel, Savannah
Summer Camp Ramah Darom, Clayton
Temple Beth Israel (Macon, Georgia)
The Temple (Atlanta, Georgia)
Yeshiva Ohr Yisrael, Atlanta

Hawaii
Temple Emanu-El (Honolulu, Hawaii)

Idaho
Ahavath Beth Israel (Boise, Idaho)

Illinois
Fasman Yeshiva High School, Skokie, IL
Hebrew Theological College, Skokie, IL
 Ida Crown Jewish Academy, Skokie, IL
KAM Isaiah Israel, Chicago, IL
Telshe Yeshiva of Chicago, IL
 Yeshiva Keser Yonah, Chicago IL
 Khal Chesed L'Avraham-The Chicago Center, Chicago IL
 Adas Yeshurun, Chicago IL
 Agudas Yisroel-Warsaw Bikur Cholim, Chicago IL
 Chicago Community Kollel, Chicago IL
 Peterson Park Kollel, Chicago IL
 The Chicago Chassidishe Kollel, Chicago IL

Indiana
Congregation Achduth Vesholom, Fort Wayne, Indiana

Iowa
Temple Emanuel (Davenport, Iowa)

Kansas

Kentucky
Congregation Agudath Achim (Ashland, Kentucky)
Louisville, Congregation Anshei Sfard (Orthodox)

Louisiana
Alexandria, Bnai Israel Synagogue
Alexandria, Congregation Gemiluth Chassodim
Anshe Sfard Synagogue,(New Orleans)
Congregation Beth Israel (New Orleans)
Touro Synagogue (New Orleans)
Shreveport, Bnai Zion Temple

Maine
Etz Chaim Synagogue
Shaarey Tphiloh, Portland, Maine

Maryland
Baltimore Hebrew Congregation
Beth Shalom Congregation (Columbia, Maryland), Columbia, Maryland
Beth Tfiloh Dahan Community School
Cascade, MD, Summer Camp Louise
Thurmond, MD, Summer Camp Airy
Congregation Or Chadash, Damascus, Maryland
B'er Chayim Temple, Cumberland, Maryland
Ohev Sholom Talmud Torah Congregation of Olney, Olney, Maryland
Yeshivas Ner Yisroel

Massachusetts
 Hebrew College, Newton, MA
Palmer, MA, Camp Ramah in New England
Adams Street Shul, Newton, Massachusetts
Ahavath Torah (Stoughton, Massachusetts)
Beth Israel Synagogue (Cambridge, Massachusetts) 
Congregation Beth Israel (Worcester, Massachusetts)
Kahal B'raira, Cambridge, Massachusetts
Shaarai Torah Synagogue (Worcester, Massachusetts)
Temple Emanuel Sinai (Worcester, Massachusetts)
Temple Israel (Boston, Massachusetts)
The Vilna Shul, Boston, Massachusetts

Michigan
Temple Emanuel (Grand Rapids, Michigan)
Young Israel of Southfield (Southfield, Michigan)

Minnesota
Adas Israel Congregation, Duluth, MN
Adath Jeshurun Congregation, Minnetonka, MN
Beth Jacob Synagogue, Saint Paul, MN
Mount Zion Temple, St. Louis, MN
Temple Israel, Minneapolis MN

Mississippi
Temple Adath Israel (Cleveland, Mississippi)
Congregation Beth Israel (Meridian, Mississippi)
Beth Israel Congregation (Jackson, Mississippi)
Gemiluth Chessed (Port Gibson, Mississippi)
Temple B'nai Shalom (Brookhaven, Mississippi)

Missouri
E.F. Epstein Hebrew Academy Missouri
United Hebrew Congregation (Chesterfield, Missouri)

Montana
Temple Emanu-El (Helena, Montana)

Nebraska

Nevada

New Hampshire
Northwood, NH, Camp Yavneh

New Jersey
Beth Medrash Govoha
Betty and Milton Katz Jewish Community Center
Birchas Chaim, Lakewood, NJ
Bruriah High School for Girls
Frisch School
Golda Och Academy
Gottesman RTW Academy
Heichal HaTorah
Hillel Yeshiva, New Jersey
Jewish Educational Center, Elizabeth, NJ
Joseph Kushner Hebrew Academy
Ma'ayanot Yeshiva High School
Mesivta Zichron Baruch, Clifton, NJ
Metro Schechter Academy
Moriah School
Politz Day School of Cherry Hill
Rabbi Jacob Joseph School
Rabbi Pesach Raymon Yeshiva
Rabbinical College of America
Rae Kushner Yeshiva High School, NJ
Schechter Regional High School
Solomon Schechter Day School of Bergen County
Talmudical Academy of Central New Jersey
Torah Academy of Bergen County
Yavneh Academy (New Jersey)
Yeshiva of Carteret, NJ
Yeshiva Gedola of Passaic
Yeshiva Gedolah of Bayonne
Yeshiva Gedolah of Cliffwood
Yeshiva Beit Midrash Gohova, NJ

New Mexico

New York
Angel Orensanz Center
Ansche Chesed
Anti-Defamation League
Associated Bais Rivka Schools
Bais Chana Women International
Central Conference of American Rabbis
Congregation Beth Elohim, Brooklyn, NY
Congregation Ohab Zedek, Manhattan, NY
 Diamond District, New York City
Friends of the Israel Defense Forces
Hebrew Union College-Jewish Institute of Religion
Hopewell Junction, NY, Summer Camp Kinder Ring
Jewish Learning Institute
Jewish Theological Seminary, New York City, NY
Manhattan Talmudical Academy, NY
Melvin J. Berman Hebrew Academy, NY
National Conference of Synagogue Youth, NY
North Shore Hebrew Academy, NY
Union of Orthodox Jewish Congregations of America
Rabbi Isaac Elchanan Theological Seminary
Rabbinical Council of America
Schechter Day School Network
Stern College for Women
Talmudical Institute of Upstate New York
The Rabbinical Assembly, NY
Temple Emanuel, New York City, NY
Torah Umesorah – National Society for Hebrew Day Schools
Touro College
Wingdale, NY, Summer Camp Ramah
Yeshiva Gedola Zichron Moshe, South Fallsburg, NY
Yeshivas Rabbeinu Yisrael Meir HaKohen
Yeshiva of Far Rockaway, NY
Yeshivah of Flatbush
Yeshiva Shaare Torah, NY
Yeshivat Kol yaakov Great neck NY
Yeshiva Tiferes Yisroel
Yeshiva University, New York City, NY
Yeshiva Zichron Yaakov
Agudas Achim Synagogue, Livingston Manor, NY
Anshei Glen Wild Synagogue, Sullivan County, NY
B'nai Israel Synagogue (Woodbourne, New York)
B'nai Jeshurun (Manhattan, New York)
Beth Joseph Synagogue, Tupper Lake, NY
Chevro Ahavath Zion Synagogue, Monticello, NY
Congregation B'nai Israel Synagogue, Fleischmanns, NY
Congregation Emanu-El of New York, Manhattan, NY
Congregation Kehilath Jeshurun, Manhattan, NY
Congregation Shaare Zedek (New York City)
Congregation Shaare Zion, Brooklyn, NY
Congregation Tifereth Israel Synagogue, Greenport, NY
Fifth Avenue Synagogue, Manhattan, NY
Kehilath Yaakov Pupa 
Park Avenue Synagogue, Manhattan, NY
Park East Synagogue, Manhattan, NY
Temple Beth Zion, Buffalo, NY
Temple Shaaray Tefila, Manhattan, NY

North Carolina
Greensboro, NC, American Hebrew Academy
Congregation Beth Israel (Asheville, North Carolina)
Temple of Israel (Wilmington, North Carolina)

North Dakota
B'nai Israel Synagogue and Montefiore Cemetery

Ohio
Anshe Chesed Fairmount Temple (Beachwood)
Oheb Zedek-Cedar Sinai Synagogue (Lyndhurst)
Park Synagogue (Cleveland Heights)
Rockdale Temple
Sherith Israel Temple
Temple Tifereth-Israel (Beachwood, Ohio)

Oklahoma
 Temple Israel (Tulsa, Oklahoma)

Oregon
Congregation Beth Israel (Portland, Oregon)

Pennsylvania
Barrack Hebrew Academy, Bryn Mawr, PA
Lake Como, PA, Summer Camp B'nai B'rith Perlman
Kesher Israel Congregation (Harrisburg, Pennsylvania)
Rodef Shalom Congregation, Pittsburgh, PA
Talmudical Yeshiva of Philadelphia
Wayne County, PA, Summer Camp Ramah
Congregation Mikveh Israel (Philadelphia)
Congregation Kehillas B'nai Shalom (Bucks County)

Rhode Island
Sons of Jacob Synagogue (Providence, Rhode Island)
Temple Beth-El (Providence, Rhode Island)
Touro Synagogue (Newport, Rhode Island)

South Carolina
 Congregation Kahal Kadosh Beth Elohim, Charleston, South Carolina
 Temple Beth Elohim (Georgetown, South Carolina)
 Beth Israel Congregation (Beaufort, South Carolina)
 Beth Israel Congregation (Florence, South Carolina)
 House of Peace Synagogue, Columbia, South Carolina
 Temple Kol Ami (Fort Mill, South Carolina)
 Temple Sinai (Sumter, South Carolina)

South Dakota
Mount Zion

Tennessee
 Margolin Hebrew Academy, Memphis, TN
 Temple Adas Israel (Brownsville, Tennessee)
 Baron Hirsch Synagogue, Memphis, Tennessee
 Temple Israel (Memphis, Tennessee)
 Mizpah Congregation, Chattanooga, Tennessee
 Congregation Ohabai Sholom (Nashville, Tennessee)
 Congregation Sherith Israel (Nashville, Tennessee)
 Temple B'Nai Israel, Jackson, Tennessee

Texas
Galveston, TX, Temple Bnai Israel
Galveston TX, Congregation Beth Jacob
Temple Beth Israel (Houston, Texas)
B'nai Abraham Synagogue (Brenham, Texas)

Utah
B'nai Israel Temple (Salt Lake City, Utah)

Vermont
Old Ohavi Zedek Synagogue

Virginia
Agudas Achim Congregation (Alexandria, Virginia)
Portsmouth, VA, Temple Sinai Congregation 
Congregation Kol Emes (Richmond, Virginia)
Stauton, VA, Temple House of Israel

Washington
Bellingham, WA, Congregation Beth Israel
Seattle, WA, Ravenna Kibbutz Community
Seattle, WA, Sephardic Bikur Holim Congregation

West Virginia
Ohev Sholom Temple
Temple Shalom (Wheeling, West Virginia)

Wisconsin
Glendale, WI, Congregation Beth Israel Ner Tamid
Madison, WI, Gates of Heaven Synagogue

Wyoming

United States territories

American Samoa

Guam

Northern Mariana Islands

Puerto Rico
Temple Beth Shalom, San Juan, PR

U.S. Virgin Islands
Hebrew Congregation of St. Thomas, St. Thomas, VI

See also
Jewish Federation
List of Jewish communities by country
List of Jewish communities in the United Kingdom
List of synagogues in the United States
List of the oldest synagogues in the United States
List of Yeshivas and Midrashas in Israel

References

Yeshivas
North America-related lists
Judaism in Canada
Judaism in the United States